The Madagascar men's national under-16 basketball team is a national basketball team of Madagascar, governed by the Fédération Malagasy de Basket-Ball.
It represents the country in international under-16 (under age 16) basketball competitions.

History
At the 2013 FIBA Africa Under-16 Championship on home soil, they finished fourth, behind champions Angola, Egypt and Tunisia. 

At the 2017 FIBA Under-16 African Championship in Mauritius, Madagascar was coached by Angelot Razafiarivony. The Malagasy recorded four wins in eight games, with one significant victory over Algeria, who would go on to finish third behind runners-up Egypt and eventual champions Mali. Overall, Madagascar finished fifth, after beating Rwanda in the Classification Game.

Players of the 2013 team that later capped for the senior national team include Elly Randriamampionona, Kiady Mahery Rabarijoelina and others. From the 2017 squad, Sitraka Raharimanantoanina later followed.

See also
Madagascar men's national basketball team
Madagascar men's national under-18 basketball team
Madagascar women's national under-16 basketball team

References

External links
Archived records of Madagascar team participations

Basketball teams in Madagascar
Men's national under-16 basketball teams
Basketball